The Wits Vuvuzela is the student newspaper of the University of the Witwatersrand (Wits) in South Africa. The newspaper is produced by the students of the Wits Department of Journalism, and appears in both printed and online formats. The print version has a circulation of 10,000 bi-monthly while the online newspaper attracts between 40-60,000 unique views per month.

See also
 List of newspapers in South Africa

References

Website
 Vuvuzela online

2010 establishments in South Africa
Mass media in Johannesburg
Student newspapers published in South Africa
University of the Witwatersrand
Weekly newspapers published in South Africa